Cedar Realty Trust, Inc. is a publicly traded real estate investment trust that invests in shopping centers in the Mid-Atlantic states.

Investments
As of December 31, 2019, the company owned 56 properties containing 8.3 million square feet, including 23 properties in Pennsylvania.

The company's largest tenants are as follows:

History
The company was founded in 1984 as Cedar Shopping Centers.

In 2005, the company acquired a 27-property portfolio for $90 million and Columbia Mall for $14 million, which it sold in 2013. It also acquired The Shops at Suffolk Downs.

In 2006, the company acquired Shaw's Plaza.

In 2009, RioCan Real Estate Investment Trust acquired a 15% stake in the company as part of a joint venture agreement.

In 2010, the company acquired a 20% interest in Exeter Commons. It also acquired 7 shopping centers from Pennsylvania Real Estate Investment Trust for $168 million. It also sold Gabriel Brothers Plaza for $4.5 million.

In 2011, the company changed its name to Cedar Realty Trust. It also sold 5 sites in Ohio anchored by Discount Drug Mart.

In 2011, Bruce Schanzer became chief executive officer.

In 2014, the company acquired Quartermaster Plaza in South Philadelphia for $92.3 million. It also sold Harbor Square for $25 million.

In 2015, the company acquired Lawndale Plaza in Philadelphia, Pennsylvania for $24.5 million.

In 2016, the company acquired East River Park Shopping Center for $39 million and The Shoppes at Arts District for $20.5 million.

In 2017, the company acquired Christina Crossing for $29.3 million.

References

External links

Financial services companies established in 1984
1984 establishments in New York (state)
Companies based in Nassau County, New York
Companies listed on the New York Stock Exchange
Real estate investment trusts of the United States
Town of North Hempstead, New York